Peter Weber (27 March 1962 – October 1999) was a Swiss handball player. He competed at the 1984 Summer Olympics.

References

External links

1962 births
1999 deaths
Swiss male handball players
Olympic handball players of Switzerland
Handball players at the 1984 Summer Olympics
Place of birth missing
Place of death missing